Established in 1908, The Order of Myth and Sword is the last secret society founded in the Sheffield Scientific School at Yale University in New Haven, Connecticut. The organisation was first formed as "Vernon Hall", a three-year society bearing the Greek letters Phi Gamma Delta (like other "Sheff" societies, such as Book and Snake "Sigma Delta Chi", and St. Elmo "Delta Phi"). 

Today, each new delegation of the Society is elected to membership at the end of the junior year. Membership of the Society is reputedly based on character, and achievements in the field of public service in accordance with the Order's mission and values.

About

At the beginning of the 20th century, Yale University was divided into two separate administrative departments: the "Academic" (for arts and humanities), and the Sheffield Scientific School for the sciences and engineering. In the "Sheff" (as it was known), undergraduate social life was centred around eight clubs, that exerted considerable influence throughout the University as a whole.

"Vernon Hall" first began its history in 1880 as a University fraternity, a chapter of Phi Gamma Delta. In 1908, its membership became exclusively open to members of the Sheffield Scientific School, where it continued to operate until financial difficulties that began with the implementation of the residential college system after 1933, led to the closure of the society in 1965.

Revived in the early 1990s under a newly-styled name, "the Order of Myth and Sword", the organisation continues to this day as a senior secret society.  This process occurred alongside the refounding of several older Yale societies, such as Mace and Chain and Torch Honor Society. 

Like other senior societies at Yale, Myth and Sword conducts meetings on Thursday and Sunday evenings. A central activity of the group is the "bio," in which each member takes one evening to relay their life story and personal development to the rest of the group.

After the refounding of the Order, it was unique in automatically considering women for election to the society's ranks following their admission to the University at large in 1969.

The society's original home was an Egyptian Revival building located at 416 Temple Street. This building was later sold to the University, and eventually demolished in 1927, to make way for the construction of Helen Hadley Hall. Like most other "Sheff" societies then, Phi Gamma Delta maintained both a residential house in addition to the "tomb" meeting space. The original residence can be found at the corner of Temple and Grove Street in New Haven, where it was built by Phi Gamma Delta in 1915. From 1944 to 1954, the society occupied the "Old Hall" building first constructed for Wolf's Head Society on Prospect Street.

See also
Yale University
Collegiate secret societies in North America

References

Secret societies at Yale
1903 establishments in the United States